Here Comes the Night is the ninth studio album by singer-songwriter Barry Manilow. The album was recorded at Sound City Recording Studios in Van Nuys, California. The United Kingdom release went by the title I Wanna Do It With You. It was released in 1982, and it scored Gold. The album has yet to be released on CD in the US, but has had 2 CD releases in Japan: one was a 1987 incarnation that included a remix of "Oh Julie" (with added background vocals and additional instrumentation), and then in 1994, a new reissue came out in Japan that contained the original mix of "Oh Julie", as released in the US in 1982 on both EP and 45.

The album contains three charting singles: "Memory" #8(A/C) / #39(pop), "Some Kind of Friend" #4(A/C) / #26(pop) and "Oh. Julie" #24(A/C) / #38(pop) which was found on the UK cassette version as a bonus track.

Track listing

US/UK album release

Side 1
"I Wanna Do It with You" (Layng Martine, Jr.) - 3:43
"Here Comes the Night" (music: Barry Manilow; lyrics: John Bettis) - 3:50
"Memory" (Andrew Lloyd Webber, T. S. Eliot, Trevor Nunn) - 4:54
"Let's Get On with It" (music: Manilow; lyrics: Manilow, Adrienne Anderson) - 4:52
"Some Girls" (Nicky Chinn, Mike Chapman) - 3:04

Side 2
"Some Kind of Friend" (music: Manilow; lyrics: Adrienne Anderson) - 4:02
"I'm Gonna Sit Right Down and Write Myself a Letter" (music: Fred E. Ahlert; lyrics: Joe Young) - 3:12
"Getting Over Losing You" (Martin Briley, Brock Walsh) - 4:16
"Heart of Steel" (music: Manilow; lyrics: John Bettis) - 2:50
"Stay" (James Jolis, Kevin DiSimone, Manilow) - 3:52

UK cassette release

Side 1
"I Wanna Do It with You" - 3:43
"Here Comes the Night" - 3:50
"Memory" - 4:54
"Let's Get On with It" - 4:52
"Some Girls" - 3:04
"Oh Julie" (Shakin' Stevens) - 2:18

Side 2
"Some Kind of Friend" - 4:02
"I'm Gonna Sit Right Down and Write Myself a Letter" - 3:12
"Getting Over Losing You" - 4:16
"Heart of Steel" - 2:50
"Stay" - 3:52
"Heaven" (Manilow, Bruce Sussman, Jack Feldman) - 3:20

Japanese release

Side 1
"I Wanna Do It with You" - 3:43
"Here Comes the Night" - 3:50
"Memory" - 4:54
"Let's Get On with It" - 4:57
"Some Girls" - 3:04

Side 2
"Some Kind Of Friend" - 4:02
"I'm Gonna Sit Right Down and Write Myself a Letter" - 3:12
"Getting Over Losing You" - 4:16
"Oh Julie" - 2:18
"Heart of Steel" - 2:50
"Stay" - 3:52

Personnel
Barry Manilow - vocals, piano, synthesizer
Richie Zito, John Pondel, Robben Ford, Art Phillips, Paul Jackson Jr., John Goux, Mitch Holder, George Doering - guitar
Leon Gaer, Dennis Belfield - bass
Victor Vanacore, Bill Mays - piano
Ian Underwood, Gabriel Katona, Robert Marulla - synthesizer
John Ferraro, Ed Greene, Vinnie Colaiuta, Bud Harner - drums
Alan Estes - percussion
Gary Herbig - saxophone
Bill Champlin, Steve George, Tom Kelly, Richard Page, James Jolis, Kevin DiSimone, Muffy Hendrix, Pat Henderson - backing vocals

Charts

Weekly charts

Year-end charts

Certifications

References

External links

Barry Manilow albums
1982 albums
Arista Records albums
Albums recorded at Sound City Studios